Richard Briggs (born 1952) is a Republican member of the Tennessee Senate representing the 7th district, which encompasses part of Knox County.

Early life
Richard Briggs was born on December 7, 1952. He attended the University of Kentucky Medical School receiving his M.D. and then completed a surgical residency and cardiothoracic fellowship at Brooke Army Medical Center.  He served in war zones including Desert Storm, Afghanistan and Iraq as a trauma surgeon.  He retired from the army with the rank of colonel.

Career
Briggs was elected to the 109th General Assembly. He is currently Chairman of the Senate State and Local Government Committee. He serves as a member of the Senate Rules Committee and Senate Transportation & Safety Committee.

Personal life
Briggs has a wife, Stephanie. He is a Methodist.

Controversies
Left intentionally blank

References

Republican Party Tennessee state senators
Living people
1952 births
University of Kentucky alumni
Politicians from Knoxville, Tennessee
21st-century American politicians